Paul Landois was an 18th-century French playwright.

We have no information on the life of this obscure writer regarded as the inventor of an intermediary theatrical genre which he called bourgeois tragedy and which was adopted by La Chaussée, Diderot, Beaumarchais, and finally by the playwrights of the 19th century.

He composed some plays, including one entitled Silvie, in one act and in prose, played by the comedians of the Comédie-Française in 1741.

He also is the author, under the signature "R", of more than 110 articles of the Encyclopédie by Diderot and D’Alembert, including those related to "peinture", "sculpture" and "gravure".

Sources 
 Pierre Larousse, Grand Dictionnaire universel du XIXe, vol. 10, Paris, Administration du grand Dictionnaire universel, (p. 140).

Bibliography 
 „Landois, Paul“, in Frank Arthur Kafker, The encyclopedists as individuals: a biographical dictionary of the authors of the Encyclopédie, Oxford 1988, (p. 189).
 Henry Carrington Lancaster (ed.): The First French ‘tragédie bourgeoise’: Silvie, attributed to Paul Landois, Baltimore 1954 (edition with a short introduction by the publisher).

External links 
 Liste of articles by Landois in the Encyclopédie.
 Sylvie on Gallica
 Sylvie on CÉSAR

18th-century French dramatists and playwrights
Contributors to the Encyclopédie (1751–1772)
Date of birth unknown
Date of death unknown